Into the Wind may refer to:

Into the Wind (2010 film), documentary about Terry Fox
Into the Wind (2012 film), British documentary directed by Steven Hatton about the RAF Bomber Command
Into the Wind (2022 film), Polish film